Congress.gov is the online database of United States Congress legislative information. Congress.gov is a joint project of the Library of Congress, the House, the Senate and the Government Publishing Office. 

Congress.gov was in beta in 2012, and beta testing ended in late 2013. Congress.gov officially launched on July 5, 2016, superseding THOMAS, the Library of Congress's original online database of congressional material, which had been launched in 1995. The website was created by Library of Congress employees using the Solr open-source search platform.

In fiscal year 2015, the Library of Congress reported 36 million page views for Congress.gov.

Contents
The resource  is a comprehensive, Internet-accessible source of information on the activities of Congress, including:

bills and resolutions
texts
summaries and status
voting results, including how individual members voted
Congressional Record, including the daily digest
presidential nominations
treaties
appropriations
Constitution of the United States with interpretive annotations from Supreme Court decisions

References

External links
Congress.gov

Computer-related introductions in 1995
Government databases in the United States
Government-owned websites of the United States
Library of Congress
Online law databases